is a railway station on the Hokuriku Railroad Asanogawa Line in Kanazawa, Japan, operated by the private railway operator Hokuriku Railroad (Hokutetsu).

Lines

Station layout
The station consists of two opposed side platforms connected by a level crossing. There is no station building, but only weather shelters on each platform. The station is unattended.

Adjacent stations

History
Mitsuya Station opened on 10 May 1925.

Surrounding area

 Asano River
 Minato Junior High School

See also
 List of railway stations in Japan

External links

  

Railway stations in Ishikawa Prefecture
Railway stations in Japan opened in 1925
Hokuriku Railroad Asanogawa Line